Municipal Stadium may refer to:

Europe and Asia
Beirut Municipal Stadium, Lebanon
Herzliya Municipal Stadium, Israel
Hiroshima Municipal Stadium (1957), Japan
Jinnah Stadium, Gujranwala or Municipal Stadium, Pakistan
Kfarjoz Municipal Stadium, Lebanon
Municipal Stadium (Telavi), Georgia
Saida Municipal Stadium, Lebanon
Sour Municipal Stadium, Lebanon
Stade Municipal (Kenitra), Morocco
Stadionul Municipal (Brăila), Romania
Tripoli Municipal Stadium, Tripoli

United States
Cleveland Stadium, commonly known as Municipal Stadium, Ohio
Grayson Stadium, originally Municipal Stadium, Savannah, Georgia
Jacksonville Municipal Stadium, now TIAA Bank Field, Florida
John F. Kennedy Stadium (Philadelphia), formerly Philadelphia Municipal Stadium, Pennsylvania
MacArthur Stadium, originally Municipal Stadium, Syracuse, New York
Midway Stadium, two stadiums, the second originally Municipal Stadium, St. Paul, Minnesota
Municipal Stadium (Waterbury), Connecticut
Municipal Stadium (Daytona Beach), now Daytona Stadium, Florida
Municipal Stadium (Baltimore), now Memorial Stadium, Maryland
Municipal Stadium (Hagerstown), Maryland
Municipal Stadium (Kansas City, Missouri)
Municipal Stadium (Waco), Waco, Texas
Phoenix Municipal Stadium, Arizona
Riverfront Stadium (Waterloo), originally Municipal Stadium, Iowa
San Jose Municipal Stadium, now Excite Ballpark, California
Salinas Municipal Stadium, Salinas, California
Spartan Municipal Stadium, Portsmouth, Ohio

Other places
Municipal Stadium (Kralendijk), Bonaire
Municipal Stadium (Sherbrooke), Quebec, Canada

See also
 Estadio Municipal (disambiguation) – municipal stadium in Spanish or Portuguese -speaking countries
 Stade Municipal (disambiguation) – municipal stadium in French-speaking countries
 Stadion Miejski (disambiguation) – municipal stadium in Poland